So Far Away may refer to:

Music 
 So Far Away (album) or the title song, by the Chords, 1980

Songs 
 "So Far Away" (Avenged Sevenfold song), 2011
 "So Far Away" (Carole King song), 1971
 "So Far Away" (Dire Straits song), 1985
 "So Far Away" (Martin Garrix and David Guetta song), 2017
 "So Far Away" (Stabbing Westward song), 2001
 "So Far Away" (Staind song), 2003
 "So Far Away", by Aiden from Conviction
 "So Far Away", by Alan Parsons from On Air
 "So Far Away", by Amici Forever from Defined
 "So Far Away", by the Apples in Stereo from Electronic Projects for Musicians
 "So Far Away", by Charli XCX from True Romance
 "So Far Away", by Crossfade from Crossfade
 "So Far Away", by David Gilmour from David Gilmour
 "So Far Away", by E-Type from Last Man Standing
 "So Far Away", by Goo Goo Dolls from Superstar Car Wash
 "So Far Away", by Mayday Parade from Anywhere but Here
 "So Far Away", by Nine Days from The Madding Crowd
 "So Far Away", by Red from Release the Panic
 "So Far Away", by Ronan Keating from Bring You Home
 "So Far Away", by Roxette from Pearls of Passion
 "So Far Away", by Social Distortion from Social Distortion

See also 
"I Ran (So Far Away)", by A Flock of Seagulls, 1982
Far Away (disambiguation)
Far Far Away (disambiguation)
Not So Far Away, by Wideawake, 2005